The Laura Biathlon & Ski Complex is a skiing venue located on the crests and slopes of Psekhako Ridge in Krasnaya Polyana, Russia. For the 2014 Winter Olympics and Paralympics in neighboring Sochi, it hosted the biathlon and the cross-country skiing portion of the Nordic combined events. Seating 7500 at both the biathlon and the cross-country skiing areas, it was first used in June 2013.

References

External links
 Официальный раздел «Газпром 2014» на официальном сайте ОАО «Газпром»
Sochi2014.com profile. - accessed 29 September 2010.

Venues of the 2014 Winter Olympics
Olympic biathlon venues
Olympic cross-country skiing venues
Olympic Nordic combined venues
Sports venues in Russia
Ski stadiums in Russia
Ski areas and resorts in Russia
Tourist attractions in Krasnodar Krai
Sport in Krasnodar Krai
Buildings and structures in Krasnodar Krai
Buildings and structures in Sochi